Wysoka may refer to the following places in Poland:
Wysoka, a town in Greater Poland Voivodeship (west-central Poland)
Wysoka, Polkowice County in Lower Silesian Voivodeship (south-west Poland)
Wysoka, Wrocław County in Lower Silesian Voivodeship (south-west Poland)
Wysoka, Gmina Tuchola in Kuyavian-Pomeranian Voivodeship (north-central Poland)
Wysoka, Gmina Cekcyn in Kuyavian-Pomeranian Voivodeship (north-central Poland)
Wysoka, Wadowice County in Lesser Poland Voivodeship (south Poland)
Wysoka, Subcarpathian Voivodeship (south-east Poland)
Wysoka, Sucha County in Lesser Poland Voivodeship (south Poland)
Wysoka, Masovian Voivodeship (east-central Poland)
Wysoka, Wągrowiec County in Greater Poland Voivodeship (west-central Poland)
Wysoka, Gorzów County in Lubusz Voivodeship (west Poland)
Wysoka, Międzyrzecz County in Lubusz Voivodeship (west Poland)
Wysoka, Zielona Góra County in Lubusz Voivodeship (west Poland)
Wysoka, Głubczyce County in Opole Voivodeship (south-west Poland)
Wysoka, Olesno County in Opole Voivodeship (south-west Poland)
Wysoka, Strzelce County in Opole Voivodeship (south-west Poland)
Wysoka, Słupsk County in Pomeranian Voivodeship (north Poland)
Wysoka, Starogard County in Pomeranian Voivodeship (north Poland)
Wysoka, Działdowo County in Warmian-Masurian Voivodeship (north Poland)
Wysoka, Elbląg County in Warmian-Masurian Voivodeship (north Poland)
Wysoka, West Pomeranian Voivodeship (north-west Poland)